Byen is the fifth studio album by Norwegian musician Bjørn Torske. It was released in July 2018 under Smalltown Supersound.

Track listing

References

2018 albums
Smalltown Supersound albums